Knoutsodonta neapolitana is a species of sea slug, a dorid nudibranch, a shell-less marine gastropod mollusc in the family Onchidorididae.

Distribution
This species was described from Naples, Italy. It has also been reported from Numana, Ancona, Italy and the Mediterranean Sea coast of Spain.

Diet
Knoutsodonta neapolitana feeds on the bryozoan Schizobrachiella sanguinea.

References

Onchidorididae
Gastropods described in 1841
Taxa named by Stefano delle Chiaje